Dutertre or Du Tertre is a French surname. Notable people with the surname include:

André Dutertre, French painter
Jean-Baptiste Du Tertre (1610–1687), French monk
Jean-Marie Dutertre (1768–1811), French pirate
Jean-François Dutertre, French musician, member of the Mélusine group
Estienne du Tertre, French composer

French-language surnames